The Défense Conseil International is the French Ministry of Armed Forces' operator for exporting French military knowledge, training and technical assistance internationally. The companies as a merger of 4 companies, of which are COFRAS (established in 1972), NAFVCO (1980 now Naval Group), AIRCO (1984) and DESCO (1990). The four companies were once part of four branches of the French army (Land, Navy, Air and Special Forces, respectively) before unification in 2000.

The DCI group is headquartered in Paris, with several other sites within France. The company also has locations abroad, notably in the Middle East.

See also 

 French Armed Forces
 Dassault

References 

Companies established in 2000
Defence companies of France
Companies based in Paris